Elena Clare Johnson (born 2 November 1985) is a badminton player from Guernsey who competed in the Island Games since 2001 and the Commonwealth Games five times.

Career 
In 2010, Johnson attempted to find a doubles partner for the 2011 Island Games in Gayle Lloyd. As Lloyd was deemed just short of the permanent residence status required to compete for Guernsey in the games, Johnson did not compete in women's doubles at the 2011 games.

For the 2021 Island Games in Guernsey, Johnson will be serving as player-manager for the Guernsey Badminton Association.

Major results 

 2001: Island Games (Isle of Man)
 Badminton, women's singles - 2nd place
 Badminton, women's doubles - 2nd place
 Badminton, team event - 1st place
 2003: English National Championships - Badminton, women's singles - eliminated in opening round
 2003: Island Games (Guernsey)
 Badminton, women's singles - 1st place
 Badminton, team event - 1st place
 Badminton, women's doubles - 2nd place
 2005: Island Games (Shetland)
 Badminton, women's singles - 2nd place
 Badminton, women's doubles - 2nd place
 Badminton, mixed doubles - 3rd place
 Badminton, team event - 1st place
 2012: Norfolk Open Championship
 Badminton, women's singles - 1st place
 Badminton, women's doubles - 1st place - with Kelly Holdway
 2013: Island Games (Bermuda)
 Badminton, women's singles - 1st place
 Badminton, women's doubles - 3rd place
 Badminton, team event - 1st place
 2014: Commonwealth Games (Glasgow)
 Badminton, women's singles - eliminated round of 32
 Badminton, women's doubles - eliminated round of 32 - with Gayle Lloyd
 Badminton, mixed doubles - eliminated in first round - with Daniel Penney
 2017: Island Games (Gotland)
 Badminton, women's doubles - 3rd place
 Badminton, mixed doubles - 1st place
 Badminton, team event - 1st place
 2018: Commonwealth Games - Badminton, women's doubles - eliminated in round of 16 - with Chloe Le Tissier
 2019: Island Games (Gibraltar)
 Badminton, women's doubles - 2nd place - with Chloe Le Tissier
 Badminton, mixed doubles - 3rd place - with Ove Svejstrup

References

1985 births
Living people
Guernsey sportswomen
Guernsey badminton players
Badminton players at the 2002 Commonwealth Games
Badminton players at the 2006 Commonwealth Games
Badminton players at the 2010 Commonwealth Games
Badminton players at the 2014 Commonwealth Games
Badminton players at the 2018 Commonwealth Games
Badminton players at the 2022 Commonwealth Games
Commonwealth Games competitors for Guernsey